The Bulgaria Hockey Federation (BHF) is the governing body of field hockey in Bulgaria. Its headquarters are in Sofia, Bulgaria. It is affiliated to IHF International Hockey Federation and EHF European Hockey Federation.

Jörg Schenk is the president of Hockey Association of Bulgaria and Antonio Antonov is the Executive Director.

Tournament history

EuroHockey Nations Championship

2005 Women's EuroHockey Championship III - 6th place
2011 Women's EuroHockey Championship III - 6th place

See also
 European Hockey Federation

References

External links
 Bulgaria Hockey-FB
 European Hockey Federation (EHF)
 

Bulgaria
Field hockey